Samuel Spokes (born 16 April 1992) is an Australian racing cyclist. He rode at the 2013 UCI Road World Championships.

Major results
2010
 1st  Overall Liège–La Gleize
 2nd Trofeo San Rocco
2013
 1st  Overall Tour de Vysočina
1st Stage 1
2014
 1st  Overall Peace Race U23
1st Stages 2 & 3
2015
 5th Road race, National Road Championships

References

External links

1992 births
Living people
Australian male cyclists
People from Tamworth, New South Wales
Cyclists from New South Wales